Reginald "Reg" Jones (birth year unknown) is a Welsh former rugby union and professional rugby league footballer who played in the 1940s.

International honours
Jones won a cap for Wales (RL) while at Salford in 1946, and he also took part in a  tour trial at Headingley Rugby Stadium, Leeds for the 1946 Great Britain Lions tour of Australia, and New Zealand.

References

External links
Search for "Reginald Jones" at britishnewspaperarchive.co.uk
Search for "Reg Jones" at britishnewspaperarchive.co.uk

Maesteg RFC players
Rochdale Hornets players
Rugby league five-eighths
Rugby league players from Maesteg
Salford Red Devils players
Wales national rugby league team players
Welsh rugby league players
Welsh rugby union players
Year of birth missing
Place of birth missing (living people)
Possibly living people